George Auriol, born Jean-Georges Huyot (26 April 1863, Beauvais (Oise) – February 1938, Paris), was a French poet, songwriter, graphic designer, type designer, and Art Nouveau artist. He worked in many media and created illustrations for the covers of magazines, books, and sheet music, as well as other types of work such as monograms and trademarks.

Biography
After he arrived in Paris in 1883, Auriol was introduced to typography and book design by Eugène Grasset and became particularly interested in the revival of historical type styles. Appointed by Georges Peignot, he created his signature typeface Auriol inspired by the Art Nouveau movement for the G. Peignot & Fils foundry, which was used in the work of Francis Thibaudeau and other publishers of the period. Auriol was a member of French bohemian culture, a denizen of the Chat Noir ("Black Cat Café") and long a friend of Erik Satie.

Auriol illustrated playbills for André Antoine's Théâtre Libre and for the Théâtre du Chat Noir in the Montmartre district of Paris, one of which became a popular poster.

Typefaces
All fonts cast by G. Peignot & Fils.

Works by George Auriol

The Harpsichord of Yeddo. Prose poem. Appears in English in Specimens of the Forms of Discourse, compiled and edited by E.H. Lewis (New York: Henry Holt and Co., 1900), p. 45. 
Le Premier Livre des cachets, marques, et monogrammes dessinés (Paris: Librairie Centrale des Beaux-Arts, 1901).
Les Trente-six Vues de la Tour Eiffel, illustrations by Henri Rivière, prologue by Arsène Alexandre (Paris: Imprimerie Eugène Verneau, 1902). George Auriol: typography, layout, & design.

Notes

References

Fields, Armond and Leroy-Crevecœur, Marie. George Auriol. Layton, Utah: Peregrine Smith Books, 1985.
Brief mention at typophile.com.

External links
Typographie & Civilisation: George Auriol & l'écriture typographique, biography, illustration & typography (French)

French artists
19th-century French poets
French male songwriters
French graphic designers
French typographers and type designers
1863 births
1938 deaths
Art Nouveau illustrators
Art Nouveau designers
People from Beauvais
People of Montmartre